Afroconulus is a genus of gastropods belonging to the family Euconulidae.

The species of this genus are found in Africa.

Species:

Afroconulus concavispira 
Afroconulus diaphanus 
Afroconulus iredalei 
Afroconulus roseus 
Afroconulus urguessensis

References

Euconulidae